The Marquart MA-4 Lancer is a single place, homebuilt biplane.

Design and development
The MA-4 is a single engine, single place biplane with conventional landing gear designed by Ed Marquart. The aircraft uses a constant-chord wing.

Operational history

Specifications (MA-4 Lancer)

See also

References

Homebuilt aircraft
Racing aircraft